Ek Nazar is a 1972 Bollywood romance film directed by B. R. Ishara. The film stars Amitabh Bachchan, Jaya Bachchan in lead roles.

Cast
Amitabh Bachchan as Manmohan Tyagi / Akash
Jaya Bhaduri as Shabnam
Nadira as Ameena Bai
Tarun Bose as Raghunath Tyagi
Manmohan Krishna
Asit Sen as Popatlal Begana
Dulari as Kalavati 
Sudhir as Deepak / Nawab Shaukatjung
Johnny Whisky
Rashid Khan
Hari Shukla
Daya Devi
Kamlabai Gokhale
Raja Duggal
Hameed
Raza Murad as Ashok

Songs
"Ae Gham-E-Yaar Bata Kaise JiyaKarte Hain" - Mahendra Kapoor
"Humeen Karen Koi Soorat UnhenBulane Ki" - Lata Mangeshkar
"Patta Patta Boota Boota" - Mohammed Rafi, Lata Mangeshkar
"Pehle Sau Baar Idhar Aur Udhar Dekha Hai" - Lata Mangeshkar
"Pyar Ko Chahiye Kya Ek Nazar" - Kishore Kumar

All lyrics penned by Majrooh Sultanpuri.

External links
 

1972 films
1970s Hindi-language films
1970s romance films
Films scored by Laxmikant–Pyarelal
Films directed by B. R. Ishara
Indian romance films
Hindi-language romance films